is a Japanese romance yuri manga series written and illustrated by Milk Morinaga and serialized in Tsubomi and later in Tsubomi Web by Houbunsha. It's published in French by Taifu Comics.

Characters
Wakatsuki a first-year high school student who joins the cooking club on a whim, only to find herself falling for the president of the club. Though she is attractive and popular, her aggressive sexual advances alienate the president. She is initially terrible at cooking, though she becomes considerably better by the end of the series.
Horikawa a third-year student and president of her school's cooking club. She cares deeply about the club and cooking in general. While she initially considers Wakatsuki a nuisance, she comes to return her classmate's affection by the end of the series.
Kanbe the former president of the cooking club and a mentor to Horikawa. Their close relationship causes Wakatsuki to become jealous and possessive.

Manga

Reception
On manga-news.com, the staff gave it a rating of 14 out of 20. On Manga Sanctuary, two of the staff gave it an averaged rating of 5 out of 10. On AnimeLand, the staff gave both volumes a rating of "interesting" (4) out of 6.

References

Cooking in anime and manga
Houbunsha manga
Lesbian-related comics
Romance anime and manga
Yuri (genre) anime and manga
2000s LGBT literature